Chief Warrant Officer Two Louis Richard Rocco (November 19, 1938 – October 31, 2002) was a United States Army soldier who received the Medal of Honor—the United States' highest military decoration—for his actions near the village of Katum, in the Republic of Vietnam, during the Vietnam War.  Despite being wounded, Rocco saved three comrades from a burning helicopter.

Biography

Early years
Born on November 19, 1938, in Albuquerque, New Mexico, Rocco was the third of nine children born to Louis Rocco, an Italian American, and Lita Rocco, a Mexican-American. In 1948, the family moved to a housing project in the San Fernando Valley and later to a barrio called Wilmington. He joined a local gang and was frequently in trouble with the law. Rocco dropped out of high school and, in 1954, when he was 16 years old, was arrested for armed robbery.

Rocco was in court for his sentencing and during a break he walked into a United States Army recruiter's office. The recruiting officer, Sergeant Martinez, accompanied Rocco to the court and spoke to the judge. The judge gave him a suspended sentence and told him that he could join the Army when he was 17 if he stayed in school, obeyed a curfew and shunned his gang.

Rocco joined the Army in 1955 and, after completing his basic training, was sent to Germany. He earned his high school general equivalency diploma during his tour there.

A few years later, Rocco was serving as a medic at Fort MacArthur in San Pedro, California, when he spotted his recruiter, Sgt. Martinez, lying badly wounded on a litter. Rocco ensured that the sergeant received special attention and constant care.

Vietnam War
Rocco served two tours of duty in the Republic of Vietnam during the Vietnam War. His first tour was from 1965 to 1966. In 1969, Rocco, who was by then a sergeant first class, returned for another tour of duty in Vietnam and was assigned to Advisory Team 162 of the U.S. Military Assistance Command.

On May 24, 1970, Rocco volunteered to accompany a medical evacuation team on an urgent mission to pick up eight critically wounded Army of the Republic of Vietnam (ARVN) soldiers near Katum Camp. The helicopter in which the team was riding came under heavy fire as it approached the landing zone. The pilot was shot in the leg and the helicopter crashed into a field. Under intense fire, Rocco was able to carry each of the unconscious crash survivors to the ARVN perimeter. Despite having suffered a fractured wrist and hip and a severely bruised back, he was able to help administer first aid to his wounded comrades before collapsing and losing consciousness.

Lieutenant Lee Caubareaux, the helicopter's co-pilot, later lobbied for Rocco to receive the Medal of Honor. On December 12, 1974, President Gerald Ford formally presented Rocco with the medal during a ceremony at the White House.

Medal of Honor
Medal of Honor citation:

Later years

Rocco made a career of the Army and earned an associate degree. He was a member of the United States Army Physician Assistant Program, class number one in 1972.  He retired from the military in 1978 as a Chief Warrant Officer Two.

Returning to New Mexico, Rocco was named director of New Mexico's Veterans Service Commission. During his tenure, he established the Vietnam Veterans of New Mexico organization, opened a Veterans' Center which provided peer counseling to Vietnam veterans, started a shelter for the homeless and a nursing home for veterans, and persuaded New Mexico legislators and voters to waive tuition for all veterans at state colleges.

Rocco returned to active duty in 1991 during the Gulf War and was stationed at Fort Sam Houston in San Antonio, Texas, where he trained medical personnel. When he returned home, he met his fourth wife, Maria Chavez Schneider, an assistant director of New Mexico AIDS Services. The couple lived in San Miguel de Allende, Mexico, from 1992 until 1998, when they moved to San Antonio, Texas. On July 11, 2000, Rocco was appointed the new Deputy State Director for Texas in San Antonio. He became instrumental in promoting Veterans Against Drugs, a nationwide school program.

In 2002, Rocco was diagnosed with terminal lung cancer; he died at his San Antonio home on October 31 of that year. He was buried with full military honors at Fort Sam Houston National Cemetery in San Antonio. He was survived by his wife, Maria Rocco; one stepdaughter, Linda Starnes; two sons, Roy and Brian Rocco; one daughter, Theresa Rocco; his mother, Lita Rocco and seven grandchildren (Dell Rocco, Cameron DuBois, Ashley Rocco, James Rocco, Thomas Rocco, Jude Sanchez & Rowan Sanchez).

The local government of San Antonio honored Rocco by naming a youth center the Louis Rocco Youth & Family Center. The Army Aviation Association of America (AAAA) offers a scholarship named in his honor.

On October 31, 2011, Rocco's duplicate Medal of Honor was stolen from his widow's San Antonio home. The original medal was given to his oldest son at his funeral.  After a visit to her husband's grave on the ninth anniversary of his death, Maria Rocco returned home to find her house burglarized. The thieves took a number of electronic items as well as the medal.

Awards and recognitions
Among Rocco's decorations were the following:

See also

List of Medal of Honor recipients for the Vietnam War
List of Hispanic Medal of Honor recipients
List of Italian American Medal of Honor recipients

Notes

External links

 
 

1938 births
2002 deaths
American people of Italian descent
American people of Mexican descent
People from Albuquerque, New Mexico
People from the San Fernando Valley
People from San Antonio
United States Army soldiers
Combat medics
United States Army personnel of the Vietnam War
United States Army Medal of Honor recipients
Recipients of the Gallantry Cross (Vietnam)
Deaths from cancer in Texas
Deaths from lung cancer
Burials at Fort Sam Houston National Cemetery
Vietnam War recipients of the Medal of Honor
People from Wilmington, Los Angeles